Atypena is a genus of Asian dwarf spiders that was first described by Eugène Louis Simon in 1894.

Species
 it contains eight species:
Atypena adelinae Barrion & Litsinger, 1995 – Philippines
Atypena cirrifrons (Heimer, 1984) – India, China, Laos, Thailand, Vietnam
Atypena cracatoa (Millidge, 1995) – Indonesia (Krakatau)
Atypena ellioti Jocqué, 1983 – Sri Lanka
Atypena pallida (Millidge, 1995) – Thailand
Atypena simoni Jocqué, 1983 – Sri Lanka
Atypena superciliosa Simon, 1894 (type) – Philippines
Atypena thailandica Barrion & Litsinger, 1995 – Thailand

See also
 List of Linyphiidae species

References

Araneomorphae genera
Linyphiidae
Spiders of Asia